The Love Patient is a 2011 gay-themed romantic comedy written and directed by Michael Simon, released to festivals in 2011, and on DVD in 2012.

Plot 
Paul (Benjamin Lutz), a professional ad executive, is suffering and feeling nostalgic about his former relationship to Brad (John Werskey), a whole year after their break up. Paul is not used to losing, is self-involved, and too haughty to go crawling back to his ex asking for a second chance, hence he comes up with an elaborate plan to win Brad's pity, affection, and love. Brad has since moved on and is now dating a bisexual former Bowflex model called Ted (Jackson Palmer).

Paul helps bail out his doctor Burt Halper (Mike Pfaff ) out of a financial strain, on condition that he diagnoses Paul with cancer and prescribes a fake treatment.  Word is conveniently spread to Brad, who reacts by coming to care for his ex. However, Paul's antics are too good, even his mother moves in, turning his apartment into a makeshift hospital. Trouble brews when his snoopy sister tags along and soon starts to notice that something is amiss. Paul soon finds himself deep in the situation without any hope of controlling it, especially when it comes to his unpredictable sister.

All his plans unravel when Brad's new boyfriend, Ted, is successfully seduced by his sister and whispers of Paul's fake cancer to Brad as she breaks the dual. Brad is distraught and feels played and manipulated but is quickly comforted by the now healed Paul. The two find themselves too intertwined since their meeting to break up their cordial relation.

Cast 

 Benjamin Lutz as Paul
 John Werskey as Brad
 Jackson Palmer as Ted
 Madison Gray as Stephanie
 Mike Pfaff as Dr. Burt Halper
 Laura Ulsh as Esther
 John Kilpatrick as Walter
 Oto Brezina as Dante
 Marc Raymond as Mr. Miller
 Annette Remter as Debra
 Sherena Rupan as Sanjin
 Alicia Seymour as Susan Halper
 Michael Simon as Mr. Lowenthal
 Jerry TerHorst as Gabe
 Aaron Farkas as Jonathon
 Jeremy Herzig as Billy
 Andrew Miller as Jack
 Anabelle D. Munro as Earth
 Denis O'Mahoney as Dr. Halper Sr.
 Tommy Evan Lee as Waiter
 Theo Mondle as Drummer
 Tara Ciabattoni as Account Executive
 Tyler McClain as Actress in Commercial
 Hunter G. Williams as Actor in Commercial

Reception

References

External links 
 

American LGBT-related films
2010s English-language films
2010s American films